The Sellout  may refer to:

 The Sellout (film), a 1952 US film
 The Sellout (album), a 2010 album by American R&B-soul singer–songwriter Macy Gray
 The Sellout (novel), a 2015 novel by Paul Beatty

See also 
 SellOut, an Australian daytime game show
 Sellout